The pueo (Asio flammeus sandwichensis) is a subspecies of the short-eared owl and is endemic to Hawaii. The pueo is one of the more famous of the various physical forms assumed by aumākua (ancestor spirits) in Hawaiian culture.

Pueo inhabit forests and grasslands throughout the islands of Hawaiʻi, although their numbers seem to be declining, particularly in the last two decades, and especially on the island of Oʻahu, upon which they were at one time numerous.  Pueo is listed by the state of Hawaiʻi as an endangered species on the island of Oʻahu.

Taxonomy 
This taxon was first named by Andrew Bloxam (as the species Strix sandwichensis). He saw it, although did not collect a specimen, while in the Hawaiian Islands in 1825 as the naturalist on board HMS Blonde. It is now considered to be a subspecies of the short-eared owl, Asio flammeus, although Storrs Olson does not consider it to be distinct from Asio flammeus flammeus.

Threats to survival 
Pueo nest on the ground, which makes their eggs and young susceptible to predation by the introduced small Indian mongoose and other predators.

Pueo are strongly affected by light pollution. They are often killed in vehicular accidents in which they dive toward the headlights of cars, possibly in an attempt to hunt. Many such collisions have been reported on Interstate H-3 and other newly built roadways in areas which once held high populations of pueo.

Pueo appear to be somewhat resistant to the avian malaria that has devastated many other endemic bird populations in Hawaii; however, they have recently become victim to a mysterious "sick owl syndrome", or SOS, in which large numbers of pueo have been found walking dazedly on roads, leading to death by collision.  The cause of sick owl syndrome is unknown; it is suspected that pesticide toxicity may be responsible, particularly through secondary rodenticide poisoning. However, it has also been hypothesized that the cause may be an infectious agent, seizure-like confusion due to light pollution, or a variety of other causes.

References

External links
More information with sounds produced by the pueo
Article on the pueo by Veronica S. Schweitzer

Asio
Endemic birds of Hawaii
Birds described in 1827
Hawaiian words and phrases